The ICA IS-28 is a two-seat sailplane produced in Romania in the 1970s. An all-metal aircraft of conventional design with a T-tail, it was originally produced with 15-metre wings, but in 1973, production shifted to the IS-28B with 17-metre wings and numerous aerodynamic refinements. These included a smaller tail with decreased dihedral, decreased dihedral on the wings, and redesigned fuselage contours. This version first flew on 26 April 1973 and was subsequently produced in versions with flaps (IS-28B2) and without (IS-28B1). Around 100 had been built by the early 1980s, with a substantial number sold for export. On April 7, 1979, Tom Knauff and R. Tawse set a world record with the IS-28 B2 glider, covering a distance of 829 kilometres on a predetermined out-and-return course from the Ridge Soaring Gliderport in Julian, Pennsylvania.

The IS-28B2 is depicted in the film Escape From New York (1980) 

The IS-28 was also produced as a motorglider, initially as just a powered version of the IS-28B2 (designated the IS-28M1) and then as the more radically redesigned IS-28M2. This version had an entirely new forward fuselage offering side-by-side seating for the two occupants, wings relocated to a low-set position on the fuselage, and tailwheel undercarriage with main units that semi-retracted backwards into the wings. The rear fuselage, empennage, and outer wing panels remained identical with the sailplane version.

The IS-29 is a single-seat sailplane that was designed and manufactured to complement training carried out in the IS-28 two-seater.

The IS-30 is a refined IS-28B2, identical in most respects other than having all-metal control surfaces (where the IS-28 has fabric-covered surfaces) and a re-designed horizontal stabiliser.

Variants
 IS-28 - sailplane with 15 metre wings
 IS-28B
 IS-28B1 - sailplane with 17 metre wings and DFS-style airbrakes
 IS-28B2 - similar to IS-28B1 with flaps and Schempp-Hirth-style airbrakes
 IS-28M
 IS-28M1 (aka IAR-34)- tandem seat motorglider version of IS-28B1 with Limbach SL.1700E1 engine
 IS-28M2 - motor-glider with side-by-side seating and three-point undercarriage
 IAR-28M2A - IS-28M2 with new wing, split flaps and Limbach L.2000E01 engine
 IS-30 - all-metal IS-28B2 with new tailplane.
 IAR-46 - trainer version of IS-28M2 with reduced wingspan and Rotax 912A engine

Operators

Romanian Air Force - received 10 IAR-28MA from 1984.
The Romanian Airclub - still using IS-28B2 and IS-29D2 for glider pilots in training and performer pilots. A fleet of 5 IS-28M2 motor-gliders were restored and declared able to fly again.

Specifications (IS-28B2)

References

Further reading

 
 
 
 
 

1970s Romanian sailplanes
ICA aircraft
IAR aircraft
Motor gliders
Aircraft first flown in 1970
T-tail aircraft
Shoulder-wing aircraft